SN 2009ip was a supernova discovered in 2009 in the spiral galaxy NGC 7259 in the constellation of Piscis Austrinus. Since the brightness waned after days post-discovery, it was redesignated as Luminous blue variable (LBV) Supernova impostor.

During the following years several luminous outbursts were detected from the SN 2009ip. In September 2012 SN 2009ip was classified as a young type IIn supernova.

References

Further reading

External links
 Light curves and spectra on the Open Supernova Catalog
 Supernova 2009ip in NGC 7259 Rochester Academy of Science

Supernovae
Astronomical objects discovered in 2009
Piscis Austrinus
Luminous blue variables